South Ozone Park is a neighborhood in the southwestern section of the New York City borough of Queens. It is just north of John F. Kennedy International Airport, between Aqueduct Racetrack to the west and the Van Wyck Expressway to the east. Adjacent neighborhoods include Ozone Park to the west; Richmond Hill to the north; Jamaica, South Jamaica, and Springfield Gardens to the east; and Howard Beach and Old Howard Beach to the southwest.

Rockaway Boulevard is South Ozone Park's main business strip. There is also a high concentration of small businesses along Liberty Avenue, which is also one of South Ozone Park's main source of revenue.

South Ozone Park is located in Queens Community District 10 and its ZIP Code is 11420. It is patrolled by the New York City Police Department's 106th Precinct. Politically, South Ozone Park is represented by the New York City Council's 28th and 32nd Districts.

Demographics
Based on data from the 2010 United States Census, the population of South Ozone Park was 75,878, a change of -3,028 (-4%) from the 78,906 counted in 2000.

The racial makeup of the neighborhood was 6.9% (5,213) White, 25.7% (19,477) African American, 1.4% (1,064) Native American, 23.3% (17,691) Asian, 0.2% (152) Pacific Islander, 10.5% (7,999) from other races, and 11% (8,337) from two or more races. Hispanic or Latino of any race were 21% (15,945) of the population.

The entirety of Community Board 10, which comprises Howard Beach, southern Ozone Park, and South Ozone Park, had 125,603 inhabitants as of NYC Health's 2018 Community Health Profile, with an average life expectancy of 81.7 years. This is higher than the median life expectancy of 81.2 for all New York City neighborhoods. Most inhabitants are youth and middle-aged adults: 22% are between the ages of between 0–17, 28% between 25–44, and 28% between 45–64. The ratio of college-aged and elderly residents was lower, at 9% and 13% respectively.

As of 2017, the median household income in Community Board 10 was $73,891. In 2018, an estimated 19% of South Ozone Park and Howard Beach residents lived in poverty, compared to 19% in all of Queens and 20% in all of New York City. One in ten residents (10%) were unemployed, compared to 8% in Queens and 9% in New York City. Rent burden, or the percentage of residents who have difficulty paying their rent, is 56% in Howard Beach and South Ozone Park, higher than the boroughwide and citywide rates of 53% and 51% respectively. Based on this calculation, South Ozone Park and Howard Beach are considered to be high-income relative to the rest of the city and not gentrifying.

South Ozone Park has many Indians, Pakistani, Indo-Caribbean Americans (mostly Indo-Guyanese and Indo-Trinidadians), and African Americans living in the area, in addition to the area's longtime Italian-American population.

Police and crime
Howard Beach, South Ozone Park, and South Richmond Hill are patrolled by the 106th Precinct of the NYPD, located at 103-53 101st Street. The 106th Precinct ranked 26th safest out of 69 patrol areas for per-capita crime in 2010. The rate of car thefts is high because of the area's proximity to the Belt Parkway, a major travel corridor. , with a non-fatal assault rate of 32 per 100,000 people, Howard Beach and South Ozone Park's rate of violent crimes per capita is less than that of the city as a whole. The incarceration rate of 381 per 100,000 people is lower than that of the city as a whole.

The 106th Precinct has a lower crime rate than in the 1990s, with crimes across all categories having decreased by 81.3% between 1990 and 2018. The precinct reported 6 murders, 16 rapes, 183 robberies, 246 felony assaults, 133 burglaries, 502 grand larcenies, and 97 grand larcenies auto in 2018.

Fire safety
South Ozone Park contains a New York City Fire Department (FDNY) fire station, Engine Co. 308/Battalion 51, at 107-12 Lefferts Boulevard.

Health
, preterm births are more common in South Ozone Park and Howard Beach than in other places citywide, though births to teenage mothers are less common. In Howard Beach and South Ozone Park, there were 97 preterm births per 1,000 live births (compared to 87 per 1,000 citywide), and 14.2 births to teenage mothers per 1,000 live births (compared to 19.3 per 1,000 citywide). South Ozone Park and Howard Beach have a low population of residents who are uninsured. In 2018, this population of uninsured residents was estimated to be 8%, lower than the citywide rate of 12%.

Twelve percent of South Ozone Park and Howard Beach residents are smokers, which is lower than the city average of 14% of residents being smokers. In Howard Beach and South Ozone Park, 27% of residents are obese, 19% are diabetic, and 34% have high blood pressure—compared to the citywide averages of 22%, 8%, and 23% respectively. In addition, 21% of children are obese, compared to the citywide average of 20%.

Eighty-three percent of residents eat some fruits and vegetables every day, which is less than the city's average of 87%. In 2018, 77% of residents described their health as "good," "very good," or "excellent," about equal to the city's average of 78%. For every supermarket in Howard Beach and South Ozone Park, there are 8 bodegas.

The nearest major hospitals are Brookdale University Hospital and Medical Center in Brooklyn and Jamaica Hospital in Jamaica.

Post offices and ZIP Code
South Ozone Park is covered by the ZIP Code 11420. The United States Post Office operates two post offices nearby: the South Richmond Hill Station at 117-04 101st Avenue, and the Ozone Park Station at 91-11 Liberty Avenue.

Education 
South Ozone Park and Howard Beach generally have a lower rate of college-educated residents than the rest of the city . While 28% of residents age 25 and older have a college education or higher, 23% have less than a high school education and 49% are high school graduates or have some college education. By contrast, 39% of Queens residents and 43% of city residents have a college education or higher. The percentage of South Ozone Park and Howard Beach students excelling in math rose from 33% in 2000 to 61% in 2011, and reading achievement rose from 37% to 48% during the same time period.

South Ozone Park and Howard Beach's rate of elementary school student absenteeism is less than the rest of New York City. In Howard Beach and South Ozone Park, 18% of elementary school students missed twenty or more days per school year, lower than the citywide average of 20%. Additionally, 82% of high school students in South Ozone Park and Howard Beach graduate on time, more than the citywide average of 75%.

Schools
 Our Lady's Catholic Academy Our Lady’s Catholic Academy is a diverse, child-centered Catholic elementary school with 2 campuses that serves the South Ozone Park community.  The first school campus located on 126th Street and Rockaway Boulevard, was founded in September 2009, under the direction and guidance of the Board of Directors. The school expanded to a second campus in September 2012 and is located on 128th Street and 111th Avenue 
 Our Lady of Perpetual Help School is the parish school for the church of the same name. It is located on  115th Street and is within the Roman Catholic Diocese of Brooklyn. Established on September 12, 1927, it educates in grades PK-8.
 P.S. 108Q - Captain Vincent G. Fowler  is an elementary school that educates an average of 1400 students from  Pre K-5th Grade. It is located across from the Aqueduct Racetrack.
 Virgil I Grissom, J.H.S. 226, Rockaway Blvd and 122nd Street. This middle school is named for the late astronaut, it features Grades 6-8 and specializes in several areas of general education practices.  It is a zoned school.
 P.S. 124 Osmond A Church
 P.S. 45 The Clarence E. Witherspoon School, at 126-28 150th Street, serves grades K-6.
 P.S 121 is located at 126-10 109th Avenue.

Library
The Queens Public Library operates the South Ozone Park branch at 128-16 Rockaway Boulevard.

Transportation
South Ozone Park is served by the  buses.

References 

Neighborhoods in Queens, New York
Little Italys in the United States